Alamgir Khan (born 18 August 1978) is a Pakistani first-class cricketer who played for Rawalpindi cricket team.

References

External links
 

1978 births
Living people
Pakistani cricketers
Attock Group cricketers
Rawalpindi cricketers
Cricketers from Rawalpindi
Zarai Taraqiati Bank Limited cricketers
Islamabad cricketers
Khan Research Laboratories cricketers
Rawalpindi B cricketers
Rawalpindi Rams cricketers